Melvin Theodore Brunetti (November 11, 1933 – October 30, 2009) was a United States circuit judge of the United States Court of Appeals for the Ninth Circuit.

Education and career
He was born in Reno, Nevada and graduated from Sparks High School, where he played the clarinet. He served in the Nevada National Guard from 1954 to 1956 where he became a sergeant. He attended University of Nevada, Reno and received a Juris Doctor from the University of California, Hastings College of Law in 1964. He was in private practice in Reno from 1964 to 1985. He was a member of the Council of Legal Advisors to the Republican National Committee from 1982 to 1985.

Federal judicial service
On February 26, 1985, Brunetti was nominated by President Ronald Reagan to a seat on the United States Court of Appeals for the Ninth Circuit vacated by Judge Herbert Choy. Brunetti was confirmed by the United States Senate on April 3, 1985, and received his commission on April 4, 1985. He assumed senior status on November 11, 1999.

Death
Brunetti died on October 30, 2009 in Reno.

Notable cases
Brunetti's notable cases include:

Osborne v. District Attorney's Office for the Third Judicial District, 423 F.3d 1050 (9th Cir. 2005), after remand, 521 F.3d 1118 (9th Cir. 2008), reversed, 129 S. Ct. 2308 (2009).  Brunetti held that an Alaska inmate's section 1983 action for post-conviction access to DNA evidence was not barred by Heck v. Humphrey, 512 U.S. 477 (1994), and, after remand, that due process conferred a right of access to the evidence. The Supreme Court later reversed 5-4 on the due process issue;
Harris v. Vasquez, 949 F.2d 1497 (9th Cir. 1990). Brunetti upheld the murder conviction and death sentence of Robert Alton Harris on habeas review; and
Adamson v. Ricketts, 789 F.2d 722, 735 (9th Cir. 1986) (en banc) (dissenting), reversed, 483 U.S. 1 (1987). Dissenting from the en banc majority, Brunetti wrote that double jeopardy did not bar the defendant's prosecution for first degree murder in connection with a bombing in Phoenix, Arizona. The Supreme Court subsequently reversed the majority opinion.

References

Sources

External links
 
Melvin Brunetti dies at 75; federal appeals court judge (Obituary from the Los Angeles Times)

1933 births
2009 deaths
Judges of the United States Court of Appeals for the Ninth Circuit
Politicians from Reno, Nevada
American people of Italian descent
Nevada National Guard personnel
United States court of appeals judges appointed by Ronald Reagan
20th-century American judges
University of California, Hastings College of the Law alumni
University of Nevada, Reno alumni
United States Army non-commissioned officers